Valentin Iliev Valov (born 11 August 1980) is a Bulgarian football manager and former professional player.

Personal life
Iliev's father, Iliya Valov, was goalkeeper for CSKA and Bulgaria's national team.

Playing career

Early career
Iliev started his career in his home town Vratsa, where he played for the local team Botev Vratsa. In June 2001 he signed with Ukrainian club Metalurg from Zaporizhzhya, where he played 21 matches and scored one goal.

CSKA Sofia
In November 2004, Iliev joined CSKA Sofia. He collected his first A Group title winner's medal at the end of the 2004–05 season. Iliev scored 4 league goals in 18 matches that season.

On 23 August 2005, Iliev scored a goal, which helped CSKA secure a historic 1–0 away win over Liverpool in the third qualifying round of the Champions League. However, it did not help them qualify for the Champions League group phase, as the "armymen" were eliminated after an aggregate score of 2–3, having lost their home game. He developed a knack for scoring key goals for CSKA making good use of his powerful heading ability. In April 2006, Iliev was given the captain's armband, as Emil Gargorov was stripped from that role as a result of loss in the Eternal derby of Bulgarian football against Levski Sofia.

In July 2006, it was announced that Iliev would be CSKA's permanent club captain. On 30 July, he captained the team that won the 2006 Bulgarian Supercup against Levski Sofia. Iliev helped CSKA to keep a clean sheet throughout the match, as they defeated Levski 3–0 on penalties. On 28 September 2006, he scored his second-ever European goal in a 2–2 home draw (after extra time) against Beşiktaş in the first round of the 2006–07 UEFA Cup.

Despite some disciplinary issues, most notably his physical confrontation with Jose Emilio Furtado in May 2007, resulting in Iliev being stripped of the CSKA captaincy, he remained a cult figure for CSKA fans.

Terek Grozny
Iliev signed with Russian side Terek Grozny in February 2008 on a two-and-a-half-year deal for a reported fee of €750,000. His first goal in the Russian Premier League came on 3 August, scoring the only goal in a 1–0 home win over Saturn Ramenskoye. On 23 August, he scored the winning goal for a 2–1 win against Lokomotiv Moscow. On 2 November 2008, Iliev scored another vital goal, this time a last-minute equaliser, in a 1–1 home draw against FC Moscow.

Iliev left Terek in February 2010, cancelling his contract by mutual agreement two months before it expired.

Universitatea Craiova
On 11 February 2010, Iliev signed a one-and-a-half-year contract with Romanian club Universitatea Craiova as a free agent.

Steaua București
In February 2011, Iliev signed a contract for one and a half years with Steaua București. On 19 December 2011, Iliev scored his first goal for Steaua against CSU Vointa Sibiu in a Liga 1 match, goal which proved to be decisive.

Volyn Lutsk
On 12 July 2012, Iliev joined Ukrainian club Volyn Lutsk on a two-year deal.

Return to CSKA Sofia
On 16 July 2013, Iliev re-signed with CSKA Sofia and was announced as CSKA's new club captain. He made his second CSKA debut in a 0–0 home draw against Cherno More on 3 August. Iliev scored his first goal since his return to the club on 24 August, scoring an equaliser, away to Lokomotiv Sofia in a 1–1 draw. On 16 April 2014, he signed a one-year contract extension, keeping him at CSKA until 30 June 2015. He ended 2013–14 season with 4 goals in 28 matches.

In October 2014, Iliev underwent an ankle surgery on his right foot. Following surgery, he was ruled out for about three months. He returned to first team action in April 2015.

Universitatea Craiova
On 29 September 2015, Iliev signed a one-year contract with Romanian club Universitatea Craiova as a free agent.

International career
In October 2010, after a long absence from the national team, Iliev was recalled to the national side by the new manager Lothar Matthäus for the Euro 2012 qualifier against Wales. On 8 October 2010, he started the match, but sustained an injury during the first half and was replaced by Pavel Vidanov.

Managerial career
Iliev joined CSKA 1948 in 2016 and oversaw successive promotions, from the fourth tier to the Second League. He was sacked after four matches of the 2018–19 season.

Outside football
Iliev is a sexton at a church in Bistritsa.

Career statistics

Club

Honours
Bulgarian Championship – 2 times 2005, 2008
Bulgarian Cup – 1 time 2006
Bulgarian Super Cup  – 1 time 2006
Romanian Cup – 1 time 2011
Best A PFG defender – 2005

References

External links
 Official FCSB profile 
 
 

1980 births
Living people
People from Knezha
Bulgarian footballers
Bulgarian football managers
Association football defenders
FC Botev Vratsa players
FC Metalurh Zaporizhzhia players
PFC CSKA Sofia players
FC Akhmat Grozny players
FC U Craiova 1948 players
FC Steaua București players
FC Volyn Lutsk players
CS Universitatea Craiova players
First Professional Football League (Bulgaria) players
Ukrainian Premier League players
Russian Premier League players
Liga I players
Bulgarian expatriate footballers
Expatriate footballers in Ukraine
Bulgarian expatriate sportspeople in Ukraine
Expatriate footballers in Russia
Bulgarian expatriate sportspeople in Russia
Expatriate footballers in Romania
Bulgarian expatriate sportspeople in Romania
Bulgaria international footballers
FC CSKA 1948 Sofia managers